is a train station in the city of Azumino, Nagano Prefecture, Japan, operated by East Japan Railway Company (JR East).

Lines
Hitoichiba Station is served by the Ōito Line and is 6.8 kilometers from the terminus of the line at Matsumoto Station.

Station layout
The station consists of one ground-level island platform serving a two tracks. The station is a  Kan'i itaku station.

Platforms

History
It was renamed to its present name on 1 May of the same year. With the privatization of Japanese National Railways (JNR) on 1 April 1987, the station came under the control of JR East. A new station building was completed in 2015.

Passenger statistics
In fiscal 2015, the station was used by an average of 777 passengers daily (boarding passengers only).

Surrounding area
former Misato Village Hall
Misato Post Office

See also
 List of railway stations in Japan

References

External links

 JR East station information 

Railway stations in Nagano Prefecture
Ōito Line
Railway stations in Japan opened in 1915
Stations of East Japan Railway Company
Azumino, Nagano